Lake Cunningham is a lake on northern New Providence Island in the Bahamas and the second largest on the island after Lake Killarney.

Ecology
Types of fish found in Lake Cunningham include largemouth bass, and black crappie.

Recreation
The Nassau Rowing Club was established at Lake Cunningham in 2012. The club hosts rowing regattas as well as competitive rowing lessons for various age and experience-levels. Other water sports that take place at the lake include jetskiing and kayaking.

References

Cunningham, Lake
New Providence
Rowing in the Bahamas